The most popular given names vary nationally, regionally, and culturally. Lists of widely used given names can consist of those most often bestowed upon infants born within the last year, thus reflecting the current naming trends, or else be composed of the personal names occurring most within the total population.

Popularity by region 
The names listed in the following tables, unless otherwise noted, represent the most current top 10 breakdowns of what newborn children are commonly being named in the various regions of the world.

Africa

Male names

Female names

Americas

Male names

Female names

Asia

Male names

Female names

Europe

Male names

Female names

Oceania

Male names

Female names

See also 
 Lists of most common surnames
 List of most popular given names by state in the United States

References

External links

Government statistics 
Australia
 Queensland list
 Australian Capital Territory list
 Northern Territory list
 South Australian list under Births Deaths & Marriages.
 Victorian list
 Western Australia

Canada
 Alberta
 British Columbia
 Ontario: female names, male names

United States
 Link to Social Security Administration which has stats on US baby names

France
 Fichier des prénoms

Ireland
 male names, female names

United Kingdom
 Scotland
 England and Wales

Most popular names
Most popular names

Infancy